Albert Monteys i Homar (Barcelona, 15 September 1971) is a Spanish comic writer and illustrator, mostly known for his work in the satirical weekly  magazine El Jueves of which he was the director from 2006 until January 2011.

Early life
Albert Monteys started reading comics in Catalan bought by his parents such as Cavall Fort or Tretzevents until he discovered the ones of Bruguera, especially Mort and Phil and Superlópez. He is also a fan of Asterix.

For two or three years he read many superhero comics and when he was twelve and fifteen, Franco-Belgian, he even bought Spirou in French. He also published in the school magazine.

He studied one year at the comics specialized school Escola Joso, joining a fanzine in Mataró titled Què trames?

Career

Early work (1990–1995)
While he was studying the first year of Fine Arts at the University of Barcelona, he provided samples to the publisher Joc Internacional, specializing in roleplaying games and wargames, things he were at that moment not very familiar about. He was accepted and on the number 17 of its magazine Líder his first newspaper strip, dated 1989, appeared. He also made illustrations for RPGs and, over time, Monteys became production manager of the publisher.

Monteys befriended faculty fellows José Miguel Alvarez, Ismael Ferrer and Alex Fito, constituting with them the collective La Penya Productions, whose comic Mondo Lirondo (Camaleón, 1993–1997) won the prize for best fanzine in Comic Fair Barcelona 1994.

Monteys graduated in 1994 and went on to illustrate RPGs as well as publishing in the Catalan children's magazine Tretzevents.

1996–2014
In 1996 Monteys published for the magazine Puta mili of Ediciones El Jueves. For the Barcelona International Comics Convention he published the comic Calavera lunar, winning an award for best new author. He also started the strip Paco's Bar for El Jueves with little success so he was suggested to make another strip starring a selfish pizza delivery man titled Tato, con moto y sin contrato, that ran from December 1996  to June 2014.

In 1997 his work rate became even more strenuous when he became director of the journals Puta Mili and Penthouse Comix, and coordinator of Zona X.

In 1998, he joined the editorial board of El Jueves, alongside Manel Fontdevila, aiming to promote the arrival of new authors: Darío Adanti, José Luis Agreda, Lalo Kubala, Pedro Vera and Bernardo Vergara. In 1997 he began the strip, Para ti, que eres joven, a two-page strip with jokes with youth themes for the magazine El Jueves alongside Manel Fontdevila as well as jokes of current events.

From 2004 to 2006 he published the strip Carlitos Fax for the children's magazine Mister K, about a silly and self-centered robot in a crazy futuristic world.

In January 2006, he was appointed director of El Jueves, facing from this position the following year the conviction of its magazine for the crime of insulting the Crown due to a cartoon in the front page of Manel Fontdevila and Guillermo Torres which included an explicit scene of Prince Felipe and Princess Letizia having sex. In 2011, he stepped down as director of the weekly magazine.

Abandonment of El Jueves
In June 2014, Monteys announced his departure from the magazine El Jueves after the editorial RBA not allowed to publish a cover with a joke which referenced the abdication of the king of Spain, Juan Carlos I. Other cartoonists also left the magazine. Those comic artist published on 18 June, the day before the coronation of Felipe VI, an online comic with jokes about the event titled Orgullo y satisfacción. He was later hired by the monthly satirical magazine Mongolia.

Universe!
In November 2014, Universe! #1, which was created, written and drawn by Monteys, was published on Panel Syndicate. It is a science fiction anthology series. As of December 2018, six issues have been published. The series was nominated in for a 2017 Eisner Award for Best Digital Comic.

Bibliography

References

External links 
Monnteys in Lambiek comiclopedia

1971 births
Living people
Spanish comics artists
Spanish comics writers
Artists from Barcelona